Robert "Bobby" Warrender (13 February 1929 – 19 September 2003) was a Scottish former professional footballer who played as an inside forward or as a winger in Scottish football for East Fife, Brechin City and East Stirlingshire and in the Football League for York City.

References

1929 births
People from Leven, Fife
2003 deaths
Scottish footballers
Association football forwards
East Fife F.C. players
York City F.C. players
Brechin City F.C. players
East Stirlingshire F.C. players
Scottish Football League players
English Football League players